Helicia acutifolia is a species of plant in the family Proteaceae. It is endemic to Papua New Guinea.

References

acutifolia
Endemic flora of Papua New Guinea
Taxonomy articles created by Polbot